East Branch Township is a township in Marion County, Kansas, United States.  As of the 2010 census, the township population was 178.

Geography

Cities and towns
The township contains the following settlements:
 No cities or unincorporated communities.

Cemeteries
The township contains the following cemeteries:
 Doyle Valley Cemetery ( Doyle Creek Cemetery), located in Section 20 T21S R2E.
 Dunkard Cemetery (a.k.a. Church of the Brethren), located in Section 13 T21S R2E.

References

Further reading

External links
 Marion County website
 City-Data.com
 Marion County maps: Current, Historic, KDOT

Townships in Marion County, Kansas
Townships in Kansas